Chợ Gạo (chữ Nôm: 𢄂𥺊), meaning "Rice Market", is a rural district (huyện) of Tiền Giang province in the Mekong Delta region of Vietnam. As of 2003 the district had a population of 185,807. The district covers an area of 235 km². The district capital lies at Chợ Gạo.

References

Districts of Tiền Giang province